Cameo Kirby is a 1930 American drama film directed by Irving Cummings and written by Marion Orth. It is based on the 1909 play Cameo Kirby by Booth Tarkington and Harry Leon Wilson. The film stars J. Harold Murray, Norma Terris, Douglas Gilmore, Robert Edeson, Myrna Loy and Charles Morton. The film was released on January 12, 1930, by Fox Film Corporation.

Cast    
J. Harold Murray as Cameo Kirby
Norma Terris as Adele Randall
Douglas Gilmore as Jack Moreau
Robert Edeson as Colonel Randall
Myrna Loy as Lea
Charles Morton as Anatole
Stepin Fetchit as Croup
George MacFarlane as George
John Hyams as Larkin Bunce
Carrie Daumery as Claire Devezac 
Beulah Hall Jones as Poulette

See also
 Cameo Kirby (1914)
 Cameo Kirby (1923)

Preservation status
 This early talkie version is presumed lost according to source imdb.

References

External links
 

1930 films
1930s English-language films
American drama films
1930 drama films
Fox Film films
Films directed by Irving Cummings
American black-and-white films
Films based on works by Booth Tarkington
1930s American films